Song Khwae is a tambon (subdistrict) of Doi Lo District, in Chiang Mai Province, Thailand.  In 2005 it had a population of 5,560 people. The tambon contains eight villages.

References

Tambon of Chiang Mai province
Populated places in Chiang Mai province